Marcus Perperna (c. 147 BC – 49 BC) was the son of a previous consul, Marcus Perperna.

Marcus Perperna became consul in 92 BC with Gaius Claudius Pulcher, and censor in 86 BC with Lucius Marcius Philippus. The censorship of Perperna is mentioned by Cicero, and Cornelius Nepos speaks of him as censorius.

Although he lived through troubled times, he did not play a prominent role in them. It was probably the same Marcus Perperna who was judex in the case of Gaius Aculeo, and also in that of Quintus Roscius, for whom Cicero pleaded. In 54 BC, Marcus Perperna is mentioned as one of the consulars who bore testimony on behalf of Marcus Aemilius Scaurus at his trial. He lived past all these times reaching the age of ninety-eight when he finally died in 49 BC. He outlived all the senators who belonged to that body in his consulship, and at the time of his death there were only seven persons surviving whom he had enrolled in the senate during his censorship.

References

147 BC
140s BC births
Year of birth uncertain
49 BC deaths
Roman censors
2nd-century BC Romans
1st-century BC Roman consuls
Perpernae